"Human" is a song by British singer and songwriter Rag'n'Bone Man, co-written by Jamie Hartman, and produced by Two Inch Punch. It was released as a digital download on 21 July 2016, through Sony Music and Columbia Records. The song is included on his debut studio album of the same name, released in February 2017. It was later used as a theme song for the American web television series Tom Clancy’s Jack Ryan, which was released in 2018, and in an ad during Super Bowl LVII for the "He Gets Us" campaign.

Composition
The song is written in the key of B minor (tuned 1/4 step flat, most probably using the scientific pitch where A is set to 432Hz instead of standard pitch of 440Hz) with a common time tempo of 75 beats per minute. The vocals span from A2 to B4 in the song.

Critical reception
Cameron Adams of The Daily Telegraph compared the song to "Take Me to Church" by Hozier for both having an "instant impact, honest lyrics and throwback to ‘real’ music in a time of corporate pop."

In 2018, the song won a Brit Award for British Single of the Year.

Live performances
Rag'n'Bone Man performed "Human" on Later... with Jools Holland on 20 September 2016. He also performed the song on Australian talk show The Morning Show on 28 October 2016. Another live performance of "Human" took place on The Graham Norton Show on 10 February 2017. He appeared on The Tonight Show Starring Jimmy Fallon on 16 February 2017.

Chart performance
On 23 December 2016, the song reached number two on the UK Singles Chart, scoring the Christmas number two of 2016. Still, the song was the most downloaded and top-selling single throughout the week, with the lack of streams influencing the overall chart position to be lower, denying the song the coveted Christmas number one. The song was certified Platinum on 17 February 2017 and 2× Platinum 21 July 2017 by the BPI. It has sold 1,269,000 combined units in the UK as of September 2017, which comprises 522,000 copies in actual sales and 75 million in streams.

In the United States, the song reached at number one on the Billboard Alternative Songs Chart and number two on Rock Airplay.  It was certified Gold by the RIAA on 7 July 2017, and has sold 324,000 copies in the US as of September 2017. It is also Rag'n'Bone Man's only entry in the Billboard Hot 100 chart, as of 2022, and reached number 74 on a chart dated 27 May 2017.

The song had widespread chart success internationally, with it reaching the #1 spot on charts in more than 15 countries.  As of February 2023, the music video has received 1.6 billion YouTube views.

Formats and track listings

 Digital download
 "Human" – 3:19
 Digital download (Rudimental remix)
 "Human"  – 4:21

Charts

Weekly charts

Year-end charts

Decade-end charts

Certifications

Release history

Tom Thum featuring Ruel cover

In December 2017, Australians hip hop beat boxer Tom Thum and vocalist Ruel released a cover version with the backing track constructed exclusively from layers of Tom's vocal technique and Ruel singing over top.

The video was filmed as part of YouTube Australia's Pop-Up Space in Sydney's AFTRS studios.

Track listing
One-track single
 "Human" – 3:30

References

External links 
 

2016 songs
2016 singles
2017 singles
Rag'n'Bone Man songs
Ruel (singer) songs
Sony Music singles
Songs written by Jamie Hartman
Number-one singles in Austria
Number-one singles in Germany
Number-one singles in Greece
Number-one singles in Hungary
Number-one singles in Iceland
Number-one singles in Poland
Number-one singles in Russia
Number-one singles in Scotland
Number-one singles in Switzerland
Ultratop 50 Singles (Flanders) number-one singles
Ultratop 50 Singles (Wallonia) number-one singles
Brit Award for British Single
Songs written by Rag'n'Bone Man
British alternative rock songs